Martin Haven is a British freelance motorsport commentator, who lives in Royal Leamington Spa. He is the Eurosport commentator for the World Touring Car Championship and World Touring Car Cup and the official commentator of the International Bobsleigh & Skeleton Federation races, broadcast on the IBSF YouTube channel.

Haven trained as a radio and print journalist, and after doing circuit commentary he made his TV debut in the late 1980s with BSB, with live coverage of the RAC Rally. He left a role at Autosport to cover NASCAR for Screensport, just as the channel was closed down by owners Eurosport.

Haven has been Eurosport's lead car racing commentator for the past decade and has headed up their coverage of bobsleigh and skeleton since 2001. He commentates for Channel 4 with their British F3 and GT coverage and has reported for NBC's American Le Mans Series coverage during their five-year tenure of the coverage.

He has commentated on the World Touring Car Championship and its support races for Eurosport since its inception in 2005, originally with David Leslie, and later alongside former British Touring Car Champion John Cleland. His current WTCR co-commentator is three-time BTCC Champion, Matt Neal. He also covers the 24 Hours of Le Mans each year, currently shown on Eurosport, but has also presented coverage of the event for Motors TV. He also presents Eurosport's coverage of the annual Dakar Rally, and has commentated on the Race of Champions, including doing the in-stadium commentary at Wembley Stadium. Other series Haven has covered for Eurosport include the FIA GT Championship, Le Mans Series, World Series by Renault, GP2 Series (alongside Gareth Rees) and Porsche Supercup. Each January, Haven also presents a round-up of the Autosport International show for Motors TV, alongside Diana Binks.

Haven has also covered Formula E when lead commentator Jack Nicholls has been unable to do so.

As well as motorsport Haven has commentated for Eurosport's and International Bobsleigh & Skeleton Federation's official channel coverage of bobsleigh and skeleton.

References

External links
Haven's official blog

British sports broadcasters
Motorsport announcers
Living people
Year of birth missing (living people)